Behramiyah Mosque is one of the historical mosques in Aleppo, Syria, dating back to the Ottoman period. It is located in al-Jalloum district to the west of the Citadel, between gate of Antioch and Khan al-Jumrok, within the historic walls of the Ancient City of Aleppo. The mosque was built in 1583 under the patronage of the Ottoman wali of Aleppo Behram Pasha and during the rule of the Ottoman sultan Murad III. It has an Ottoman khanqah-style architecture with circular minaret and a large central dome.

Throughout its history, the mosque was frequently renovated. During the 17th century, the minaret fell down and was re-constructed in 1699. After the deadly earthquake of Aleppo in 1822, the dome was destroyed and renovated in later in 1860.

Gallery

See also
 Islam in Syria

References

Further reading

Ottoman mosques in Syria
Ottoman architecture in Aleppo
Mosques in Aleppo
Mausoleums in Syria
16th-century mosques
1583 establishments in the Ottoman Empire
Mosques completed in 1583